The following elections occurred in the year 2008.

 Electoral calendar 2008
 2008 United Nations Security Council election

Africa
 2008 Angolan legislative election
 2008 Anjouan presidential election
 2008 Republic of the Congo Senate election
 2008 Djiboutian parliamentary election
 2008 Egyptian municipal elections
 2008 Equatorial Guinean legislative election
 2008 Ethiopian local elections
 2008 Gabonese local elections
 2008 Ghanaian parliamentary election
 2008 Ghanaian presidential election
 2008 Guinea-Bissau legislative election
 2008 Mahoran legislative election
 2008 Mauritian presidential election
 2008 Rwandan parliamentary election
 2008 Sahrawi legislative election
 2008 Sierra Leonean local elections
 2008 South African municipal by-elections
 2008 South African presidential election
 2008 Swazi parliamentary election
 2008 Zambian presidential election
 2008 Zimbabwean parliamentary election

Nigeria
 2008 Kogi State gubernatorial by-election

Zimbabwean presidential
 2008 Zimbabwean presidential election
 Campaigning for the 2008 Zimbabwean presidential election
 International reaction to the 2008 Zimbabwean presidential election
 Joint Monitoring and Implementation Committee
 Mavambo/Kusile/Dawn
 Movement for Democratic Change – Mutambara
 Movement for Democratic Change – Tsvangirai
 Operation Mavhoterapapi
 2008–2009 Zimbabwean political negotiations
 Second round of voting in the 2008 Zimbabwean presidential election
 Simba Makoni presidential campaign, 2008
 2008 Southern African Development Community emergency meeting
 Morgan Tsvangirai
 Vote counting for the 2008 Zimbabwean presidential election

Asia
 2008 Armenian presidential election
 2008 Azerbaijani presidential election
 2004 Bangkok gubernatorial election
 2008 Bangkok gubernatorial election
 2008 Bangladeshi general election
 2007–2008 Bhutanese National Council election
 2008 Bhutanese general election
 2008 Burmese constitutional referendum
 2008 Cambodian parliamentary election
 2008 Hong Kong legislative election
 2008 Kadima leadership election
 2008 Kuwaiti parliamentary election
 2008 Lebanese presidential election
 2008 Liberal Democratic Party (Japan) leadership election
 2008 Maldivian presidential election
 2008 Mongolian legislative election
 2008 Nepalese Constituent Assembly election
 2008 Nepalese presidential election
 2008 South Korean legislative election
 2008 Sri Lanka Eastern Provincial Council elections
 2008–2009 Sri Lanka Provincial Council elections
 2008 Thai Senate election
 2008–2009 Turkmenistan parliamentary election

India
 2008 elections in India
 2008 Delhi Legislative Assembly election
 2014 Jammu and Kashmir Legislative Assembly election
 2008 Karnataka Legislative Assembly election
 2008 Madhya Pradesh Legislative Assembly election
 2008 Meghalaya Legislative Assembly election
 2008 Rajasthan Legislative Assembly election
 2008 Tripura Legislative Assembly election
 2008 Uttarakhand local body elections

Iran
 2008 Iranian legislative election

Japan
 2008 Fujimi mayoral election
 2008 Kyoto mayoral election
 2008 Meguro mayoral election
 2008 Minato mayoral election
 2008 Nishihara mayoral election
 2008 Osaka gubernatorial election

Malaysia
 2008 Malaysian general election
 2008 Permatang Pauh by-election
 2008 Sabah state election

Pakistan
 2008 Pakistani general election
 2008 Pakistani presidential election

Philippines
 2008 Autonomous Region in Muslim Mindanao general election
 2008 Quezon del Sur creation plebiscite

Russia
 2008 Russian presidential election
 Fairness of the 2008 Russian presidential election

Taiwan (Republic of China)
 2008 Taiwan legislative election
 List of candidates in the 2008 Taiwan legislative election
 2008 Taiwan presidential election
 2008 Taiwanese transitional justice referendum
 2008 Taiwanese United Nations membership referendums

Europe
 2008 Alderney election
 2008 Armenian presidential election
 2008 Austrian legislative election
 2008 Azerbaijani presidential election
 2008 Belarusian parliamentary election
 2008 Bosnia and Herzegovina municipal elections
 2008 Cypriot presidential election
 2008 Czech Senate election
 2008 Czech presidential election
 2008 Faroese parliamentary election
 2008 Fianna Fáil leadership election
 2008 Georgian NATO membership referendum
 2008 Georgian legislative election date referendum
 2008 Georgian legislative election
 2008 Georgian presidential election
 2008 Guernsey general election
 2008 Hungarian fees abolition referendum
 2008 Icelandic presidential election
 2008 Jersey general election
 2008 Kyiv local election
 2008 Kosovan presidential election
 2008 Latvian constitutional referendum
 2008 Latvian pensions law referendum
 2008 Lithuanian nuclear power referendum
 2008 Lithuanian parliamentary election
 2008 Macedonian parliamentary election
 2008 Maltese general election
 2008 Maltese local council elections
 2008 Monegasque parliamentary election
 2008 Montenegrin presidential election
 2008 Romanian legislative election
 2008 Romanian local election
 2008 Sammarinese general election
 2008 Sark general election
 2008 Serbian presidential election
 2008 Serbian local elections
 2008 Serbian parliamentary election
 2008 Slovenian parliamentary election
 Twenty-eighth Amendment of the Constitution Bill, 2008 (Ireland)
 2008 Vojvodina parliamentary election

Austria
 Austrian legislative election campaign posters, 2008
 Austrian legislative election issue questionnaires, 2008
 2008 Graz local election
 2008 Lower Austrian state election
 2008 Tyrolean state election

France
 2008 French Polynesian legislative election
 2008 French Polynesian presidential election
 2008 French Senate election
 2008 French cantonal elections
 2008 French municipal elections
 2008 Lyon municipal election
 2008 Marseille municipal election
 2008 Paris municipal election

Germany
 2008 Bavaria state election
 2008 Hamburg state election
 2008 Hesse state election
 2008 Lower Saxony state election

Hungary
 Hungarian fees abolition referendum

Russia
 2008 Russian presidential election
 Fairness of the 2008 Russian presidential election

Spain
 2008 Andalusian parliamentary election
 2008 Spanish general election

Switzerland
 2008 Swiss Federal Council election
 February 2008 Swiss referendum
 June 2008 Swiss referendum
 November 2008 Swiss referendum

United Kingdom
 2008 Crewe and Nantwich by-election
 2008 Glasgow East by-election
 2008 Glenrothes by-election
 2008 Green Party of England and Wales leadership election
 2008 Haltemprice and Howden by-election
 2008 Henley by-election
 2008 London Assembly election
 2008 London mayoral election
 2008 Scottish Labour Party deputy leadership election
 2008 Scottish Labour Party leadership election
 2008 Scottish Liberal Democrats leadership election
 2008 United Kingdom local elections

United Kingdom local
 2008 United Kingdom local elections
 2008 Ceredigion County Council election
 2008 Monmouthshire County Council election

English local
 2008 Adur Council election
 2008 Amber Valley Council election
 2008 Barnsley Council election
 2008 Barrow-in-Furness Council election
 2008 Bassetlaw Council election
 2008 Birmingham City Council election
 2008 Blackburn with Darwen Council election
 2008 Bolton Council election
 2008 Brentwood Council election
 2008 Broxbourne Council election
 2008 Burnley Council election
 2008 Bury Council election
 2008 Calderdale Council election
 2008 Cheltenham Council election
 2008 Cherwell Council election
 2008 Cheshire East Council election
 2008 Cheshire West and Chester Council election
 2008 Chorley Council election
 2008 Coventry Council election
 2008 Craven Council election
 2008 Daventry Council election
 2008 Derby Council election
 2008 Dudley Council election
 2008 Fareham Council election
 2008 Gosport Council election
 2008 Halton Council election
 2008 Harlow Council election
 2008 Hart Council election
 2008 Hastings Council election
 2008 Hull Council election
 2008 Hyndburn Council election
 2008 Ipswich Borough Council election
 2008 Knowsley Council election
 2008 Liverpool Council election
 2008 Manchester Council election
 2008 Mole Valley Council election
 2008 North Tyneside Council election
 2007 Norwich Council election
 2008 Norwich Council election
 2008 Nuneaton and Bedworth Council election
 2008 Oldham Council election
 2008 Oxford City Council election
 2008 Portsmouth Council election
 2008 Preston Council election
 2008 Purbeck Council election
 2008 Redditch Council election
 2008 Rochdale Council election
 2008 Rochford Council election
 2008 Rossendale Council election
 2008 Runnymede Council election
 2008 Rushmoor Council election
 2008 Salford Council election
 2008 Sefton Council election
 2008 Sheffield Council election
 2008 Slough Council election
 2010 Solihull Council election
 2008 Solihull Council election
 2008 South Tyneside Council election
 2008 Southend-on-Sea Council election
 2008 St Albans Council election
 2008 St Helens Council election
 2008 Stevenage Council election
 2008 Stockport Council election
 2008 Stoke-on-Trent Council election
 2008 Stratford-on-Avon Council election
 2008 Swindon Council election
 2008 Tameside Council election
 2008 Tamworth Council election
 2008 Tandridge Council election
 2008 Three Rivers Council election
 2008 Thurrock Council election
 2008 Trafford Council election
 2008 Tunbridge Wells Council election
 2008 Wakefield Council election
 2008 Watford Council election
 2008 Welwyn Hatfield Council election
 2008 West Lancashire Council election
 2008 Weymouth and Portland Council election
 2008 Wigan Council election
 2008 Winchester Council election
 2008 Wirral Council election
 2008 Woking Council election
 2008 Wokingham Council election
 2008 Wolverhampton Council election
 2008 Worcester Council election
 2008 Worthing Council election
 2008 Wyre Forest Council election

North America
 2008 Belizean constitutional referendum
 2008 Belizean legislative election
 2008 Greenlandic self-government referendum

Canada
 Canadian electoral calendar, 2008
 2008 Alberta general election
 2008 Alberta Liberal Party leadership election
 2008 British Columbia municipal elections
 2008 Canadian federal by-elections
 2008 Canadian federal election
 2008 New Brunswick municipal elections
 2008 Halifax Regional Municipality municipal election
 2008 Nova Scotia municipal elections
 2008 Nunavut general election
 2008 Progressive Conservative Party of New Brunswick leadership election
 2008 Quebec general election
 2008 Quebec provincial by-elections
 2008 Vancouver municipal election

Canadian federal
 2008 Canadian federal election
 Anything But Conservative
 Results of the 2008 Canadian federal election
 Results of the 2008 Canadian federal election by riding
 Newspaper endorsements in the 2008 Canadian federal election
 Opinion polling for the 2008 Canadian federal election
 Scandalpedia
 Timeline of the 2008 Canadian federal election

Caribbean
 2008 Barbadian general election
 2008 Cuban legislative election
 2008 Cuban presidential election
 2008 Dominican Republic presidential election
 2008 Grenadian general election
 2008 Trinidadian local elections
 2008 Trinidad and Tobago presidential election

Puerto Rican
 2008 Puerto Rican general election
 2008 Puerto Rico Democratic primary
 2008 Puerto Rico gubernatorial election
 2008 New Progressive Party of Puerto Rico primaries
 2008 Popular Democratic Party of Puerto Rico primaries
 2008 Puerto Rico Republican caucuses
 United States House of Representatives election in Puerto Rico, 2008

United States Virgin Islands
 2008 United States Virgin Islands general election
 United States Virgin Islands Democratic territorial convention, 2008
 United States Virgin Islands Republican caucuses, 2008
 2008 United States House of Representatives election in the United States Virgin Islands

Mexico
 2008 Mexican elections
 2008 Hidalgo state election

Puerto Rican
 2008 Puerto Rican general election
 Puerto Rico Democratic primary, 2008
 2008 Puerto Rico gubernatorial election
 New Progressive Party (Puerto Rico) primaries, 2008
 Popular Democratic Party (Puerto Rico) primaries, 2008
 Puerto Rico Republican caucuses, 2008
 United States House of Representatives election in Puerto Rico, 2008

United States
 2008 United States elections
 2008 United States presidential election

United States Senate
 2008 United States Senate elections
 United States Senate election in Alabama, 2008
 United States Senate election in Alaska, 2008
 United States Senate election in Arkansas, 2008
 United States Senate election in Colorado, 2008
 United States Senate election in Delaware, 2008
 United States Senate election in Georgia, 2008
 United States Senate election in Idaho, 2008
 United States Senate election in Illinois, 2008
 United States Senate election in Iowa, 2008
 United States Senate election in Kansas, 2008
 United States Senate election in Kentucky, 2008
 United States Senate election in Louisiana, 2008
 United States Senate election in Maine, 2008
 United States Senate election in Massachusetts, 2008
 United States Senate election in Michigan, 2008
 United States Senate election in Minnesota, 2008
 United States Senate election in Mississippi, 2008
 United States Senate special election in Mississippi, 2008
 United States Senate election in Montana, 2008
 United States Senate election in Nebraska, 2008
 United States Senate election in New Hampshire, 2008
 United States Senate election in New Jersey, 2008
 United States Senate election in New Mexico, 2008
 United States Senate election in North Carolina, 2008
 United States Senate election in Oklahoma, 2008
 2008 Opinion polling for the United States Senate elections
 United States Senate election in Oregon, 2008
 United States Senate election in Rhode Island, 2008
 United States Senate election in South Carolina, 2008
 United States Senate election in South Dakota, 2008
 United States Senate election in Tennessee, 2008
 United States Senate election in Texas, 2008
 United States Senate election in Virginia, 2008
 United States Senate election in West Virginia, 2008
 United States Senate election in Wyoming, 2008
 United States Senate special election in Wyoming, 2008

United States House of Representatives
 2008 United States House of Representatives elections
 United States House of Representatives elections in Alabama, 2008
 United States House of Representatives election in Alaska, 2008
 United States House of Representatives election in American Samoa, 2008
 United States House of Representatives elections in Arizona, 2008
 United States House of Representatives elections in Arkansas, 2008
 United States House of Representatives elections in California, 2008
 2008 California's 12th congressional district special election
 United States House of Representatives elections in Colorado, 2008
 United States House of Representatives elections in Connecticut, 2008
 United States House of Representatives election in Delaware, 2008
 United States House of Representatives election in the District of Columbia, 2008
 United States House of Representatives elections in Florida, 2008
 United States House of Representatives elections in Georgia, 2008
 United States House of Representatives election in Guam, 2008
 United States House of Representatives elections in Hawaii, 2008
 United States House of Representatives elections in Idaho, 2008
 United States House of Representatives elections in Illinois, 2008
 2008 Illinois's 14th congressional district special election
 United States House of Representatives elections in Indiana, 2008
 2008 Indiana's 7th congressional district special election
 United States House of Representatives elections in Iowa, 2008
 United States House of Representatives elections in Kansas, 2008
 United States House of Representatives elections in Kentucky, 2008
 United States House of Representatives elections in Louisiana, 2008
 2008 Louisiana's 1st congressional district special election
 2008 Louisiana's 6th congressional district special election
 2008 Louisiana's 2nd congressional district election
 United States House of Representatives elections in Maine, 2008
 United States House of Representatives elections in Maryland, 2008
 2008 Maryland's 4th congressional district special election
 United States House of Representatives elections in Massachusetts, 2008
 United States House of Representatives elections in Michigan, 2008
 United States House of Representatives elections in Minnesota, 2008
 2008 Mississippi's 1st congressional district special election
 United States House of Representatives elections in Mississippi, 2008
 United States House of Representatives elections in Missouri, 2008
 United States House of Representatives election in Montana, 2008
 United States House of Representatives elections in Nebraska, 2008
 United States House of Representatives elections in Nevada, 2008
 United States House of Representatives elections in New Hampshire, 2008
 United States House of Representatives elections in New Jersey, 2008
 2008 New Jersey's 7th congressional district election
 United States House of Representatives elections in New Mexico, 2008
 United States House of Representatives elections in New York, 2008
 2008 New York's 26th congressional district election
 2008 New York's 19th congressional district election
 2008 New York's 20th congressional district election
 2008 New York's 29th congressional district election
 2008 New York's 25th congressional district election
 United States House of Representatives elections in North Carolina, 2008
 United States House of Representatives election in North Dakota, 2008
 United States House of Representatives election in the Northern Mariana Islands, 2008
 United States House of Representatives elections in Ohio, 2008
 2008 Ohio's 11th congressional district special election
 United States House of Representatives elections in Oklahoma, 2008
 2008 Opinion polling for the United States House of Representatives elections
 United States House of Representatives elections in Oregon, 2008
 United States House of Representatives elections in Pennsylvania, 2008
 United States House of Representatives election in Puerto Rico, 2008
 United States House of Representatives elections in Rhode Island, 2008
 United States House of Representatives elections in South Carolina, 2008
 United States House of Representatives election in South Dakota, 2008
 United States House of Representatives elections in Tennessee, 2008
 United States House of Representatives elections in Texas, 2008
 United States House of Representatives elections results, 2008
 United States House of Representatives elections in Utah, 2008
 United States House of Representatives election in Vermont, 2008
 United States House of Representatives election in the United States Virgin Islands, 2008
 United States House of Representatives elections in Virginia, 2008
 2008 Virginia's 1st congressional district election
 2008 Virginia's 7th congressional district election
 United States House of Representatives elections in Washington, 2008
 United States House of Representatives elections in West Virginia, 2008
 United States House of Representatives elections in Wisconsin, 2008
 United States House of Representatives election in Wyoming, 2008

United States gubernatorial
 2008 United States gubernatorial elections
 Opinion polling for the 2008 United States gubernatorial elections
 2008 American Samoa gubernatorial election
 2008 Delaware gubernatorial election
 2008 Indiana gubernatorial election
 2008 Missouri Lieutenant gubernatorial election
 2008 Missouri gubernatorial election
 2008 Montana gubernatorial election
 2008 New Hampshire gubernatorial election
 2008 North Carolina gubernatorial election
 2008 North Dakota gubernatorial election
 2008 Puerto Rico gubernatorial election
 2008 Utah gubernatorial election
 2008 Vermont gubernatorial election
 2008 Washington gubernatorial election
 2008 West Virginia gubernatorial election

Alabama
 Alabama Republican primary, 2008
 Alabama Democratic primary, 2008
 United States House of Representatives elections in Alabama, 2008
 United States Senate election in Alabama, 2008
 United States presidential election in Alabama, 2008

Alaska
 Alaska Republican caucuses, 2008
 Alaska Democratic caucuses, 2008
 United States House of Representatives election in Alaska, 2008
 Juneau, Alaska, regular election, 2008
 United States Senate election in Alaska, 2008
 United States presidential election in Alaska, 2008

American Samoa
 2008 American Samoan general election
 American Samoa Democratic caucuses, 2008
 2008 American Samoa gubernatorial election
 American Samoa Republican caucuses, 2008
 United States House of Representatives election in American Samoa, 2008

Arizona
 Arizona Democratic primary, 2008
 Arizona Republican primary, 2008
 Arizona Proposition 102 (2008)
 United States House of Representatives elections in Arizona, 2008
 United States presidential election in Arizona, 2008

Arkansas
 Arkansas Democratic primary, 2008
 Arkansas Proposed Initiative Act No. 1
 Arkansas Republican primary, 2008
 United States House of Representatives elections in Arkansas, 2008
 United States Senate election in Arkansas, 2008
 United States presidential election in Arkansas, 2008

California
 February 2008 California state elections
 June 2008 California state elections
 November 2008 California state elections
 2008 California's 12th congressional district special election
 California Democratic primary, 2008
 California Republican primary, 2008
 2008 San Francisco Board of Supervisors elections
 February 2008 San Francisco general elections
 June 2008 San Francisco general elections
 November 2008 San Francisco general elections
 2008 California State Assembly elections
 2008 California State Senate elections
 United States House of Representatives elections in California, 2008
 United States presidential election in California, 2008

Colorado
 Colorado Democratic caucuses, 2008
 Colorado Republican caucuses, 2008
 United States House of Representatives elections in Colorado, 2008
 United States Senate election in Colorado, 2008
 United States presidential election in Colorado, 2008

Connecticut
 Connecticut Democratic primary, 2008
 Connecticut Republican primary, 2008
 2008 Connecticut's 4th congressional district election
 United States House of Representatives elections in Connecticut, 2008

Delaware
 2008 Delaware gubernatorial election
 Delaware Republican primary, 2008
 Delaware Democratic primary, 2008
 United States House of Representatives election in Delaware, 2008
 United States Senate election in Delaware, 2008
 United States presidential election in Delaware, 2008

Florida
 Florida Democratic primary, 2008
 Florida Republican primary, 2008
 United States House of Representatives elections in Florida, 2008

Georgia (U.S. state)
 Georgia Democratic primary, 2008
 Georgia Republican primary, 2008
 2008 Georgia state elections
 2008 Georgia statewide elections
 United States House of Representatives elections in Georgia, 2008
 United States Senate election in Georgia, 2008
 United States presidential election in Georgia, 2008

Guam
 2008 Guamanian general election
 Guam Democratic territorial convention, 2008
 2008 Guamanian legislative election
 Guam Republican caucuses, 2008
 United States House of Representatives election in Guam, 2008

Hawaii
 Hawaii Democratic caucuses, 2008
 Hawaii Republican caucuses, 2008
 United States House of Representatives elections in Hawaii, 2008
 United States presidential election in Hawaii, 2008

Idaho
 Idaho Democratic caucuses, 2008
 Idaho Republican primary, 2008
 United States House of Representatives elections in Idaho, 2008
 United States Senate election in Idaho, 2008
 United States presidential election in Idaho, 2008

Illinois
 Illinois Democratic primary, 2008
 Illinois Republican primary, 2008
 2008 Illinois's 14th congressional district special election
 2008 Illinois Senate election
 United States House of Representatives elections in Illinois, 2008
 United States Senate election in Illinois, 2008
 United States presidential election in Illinois, 2008

Indiana
 Indiana Democratic primary, 2008
 2008 Indiana gubernatorial election
 United States House of Representatives elections in Indiana, 2008
 United States presidential election in Indiana, 2008
 Indiana Republican primary, 2008
 2008 Indiana's 7th congressional district special election

Iowa
 2008 Iowa House of Representatives election
 2008 Iowa Democratic caucuses
 2008 Iowa Republican caucuses
 2008 Iowa Senate election
 2008 United States House of Representatives elections in Iowa
 2008 United States Senate election in Iowa
 2008 United States presidential election in Iowa

Kansas
 Kansas Democratic caucuses, 2008
 Kansas Republican caucuses, 2008
 United States House of Representatives elections in Kansas, 2008
 United States Senate election in Kansas, 2008
 United States presidential election in Kansas, 2008

Kentucky
 Kentucky Democratic primary, 2008
 Kentucky Republican primary, 2008
 United States House of Representatives elections in Kentucky, 2008
 United States Senate election in Kentucky, 2008

Louisiana
 Louisiana Democratic primary, 2008
 Louisiana Republican caucuses, 2008
 Louisiana Republican primary, 2008
 2008 Louisiana's 1st congressional district special election
 2008 Louisiana's 6th congressional district special election
 United States House of Representatives elections in Louisiana, 2008
 United States Senate election in Louisiana, 2008
 United States presidential election in Louisiana, 2008

Maine
 Maine Democratic caucuses, 2008
 Maine Republican caucuses, 2008
 United States presidential election in Maine, 2008
 United States House of Representatives elections in Maine, 2008
 United States Senate election in Maine, 2008

Maryland
 Maryland Democratic primary, 2008
 Maryland Republican primary, 2008
 2008 Maryland's 4th congressional district special election
 United States House of Representatives elections in Maryland, 2008
 United States presidential election in Maryland, 2008

Massachusetts
 2008 Massachusetts general election
 2008 Massachusetts House of Representatives elections
 United States House of Representatives elections in Massachusetts, 2008
 Massachusetts Republican primary, 2008
 United States presidential election in Massachusetts, 2008
 Massachusetts Democratic primary, 2008
 United States Senate election in Massachusetts, 2008
 2008 Massachusetts Senate elections

Michigan
 Michigan Democratic primary, 2008
 Michigan Republican primary, 2008
 State House elections in Michigan, 2008
 United States House of Representatives elections in Michigan, 2008
 United States Senate election in Michigan, 2008
 United States presidential election in Michigan, 2008

Minnesota
 Minnesota Democratic caucuses, 2008
 Minnesota Republican caucuses, 2008
 2008 Minnesota elections
 United States House of Representatives elections in Minnesota, 2008
 United States Senate election in Minnesota, 2008
 United States presidential election in Minnesota, 2008

Mississippi
 Mississippi Democratic primary, 2008
 Mississippi Republican primary, 2008
 2008 Mississippi's 1st congressional district special election
 United States House of Representatives elections in Mississippi, 2008
 United States Senate special election in Mississippi, 2008
 United States Senate election in Mississippi, 2008
 United States presidential election in Mississippi, 2008

Missouri
 Missouri Democratic primary, 2008
 2008 Missouri Lieutenant gubernatorial election
 2008 Missouri gubernatorial election
 Missouri Republican primary, 2008
 United States House of Representatives elections in Missouri, 2008
 United States presidential election in Missouri, 2008

Montana
 Tom L. Burnett
 Montana Republican caucuses, 2008
 2008 Montana gubernatorial election
 United States House of Representatives election in Montana, 2008
 Montana Democratic primary, 2008
 United States Senate election in Montana, 2008
 United States presidential election in Montana, 2008

Nebraska
 Nebraska Democratic caucuses, 2008
 Nebraska Republican primary, 2008
 United States House of Representatives elections in Nebraska, 2008
 United States Senate election in Nebraska, 2008

Nevada
 Nevada Democratic caucuses, 2008
 Nevada Republican caucuses, 2008
 United States House of Representatives elections in Nevada, 2008

New Hampshire
 New Hampshire Democratic primary, 2008
 2008 New Hampshire gubernatorial election
 New Hampshire Republican primary, 2008
 United States House of Representatives elections in New Hampshire, 2008
 United States Senate election in New Hampshire, 2008
 United States presidential election in New Hampshire, 2008

New Jersey
 Democratic primary in New Jersey, 2008
 New Jersey Democratic primary, 2008
 New Jersey Republican primary, 2008
 2008 New Jersey's 7th congressional district election
 Republican primary in New Jersey, 2008
 United States Senate election in New Jersey, 2008
 United States presidential election in New Jersey, 2008

New Mexico
 New Mexico Democratic primary, 2008
 New Mexico Republican primary, 2008
 United States House of Representatives elections in New Mexico, 2008
 United States Senate election in New Mexico, 2008
 United States presidential election in New Mexico, 2008

New York
 2008 New York state elections
 New York Republican primary, 2008
 2008 New York's 19th congressional district election
 2008 New York's 20th congressional district election
 2008 New York's 26th congressional district election
 2008 New York's 29th congressional district election
 United States Democratic presidential primary in New York, 2008
 United States House of Representatives elections in New York, 2008
 United States presidential election in New York, 2008

North Carolina
 2008 North Carolina judicial election
 2008 North Carolina Council of State election
 2008 North Carolina Democratic primary
 2008 North Carolina lieutenant gubernatorial election
 2008 North Carolina Republican primary
 2008 North Carolina gubernatorial election
 2008 North Carolina Senate election
 2008 United States House of Representatives elections in North Carolina
 2008 United States Senate election in North Carolina
 2008 United States presidential election in North Carolina

North Dakota
 North Dakota Democratic caucuses, 2008
 2008 North Dakota gubernatorial election
 North Dakota Republican caucuses, 2008
 United States House of Representatives election in North Dakota, 2008

Northern Mariana Islands
 Northern Mariana Islands Republican caucuses, 2008
 United States House of Representatives election in the Northern Mariana Islands, 2008

Ohio
 2008 Ohio's 11th congressional district special election
 Ohio Democratic primary, 2008
 Ohio Republican primary, 2008
 United States House of Representatives elections in Ohio, 2008

Oklahoma
 Oklahoma Democratic primary, 2008
 Oklahoma Republican primary, 2008
 2008 Oklahoma state elections
 United States presidential election in Oklahoma, 2008
 United States House of Representatives elections in Oklahoma, 2008
 United States Senate election in Oklahoma, 2008

Oregon
 Mike Erickson
 Oregon Democratic primary, 2008
 Oregon Republican primary, 2008
 2008 Oregon legislative elections
 2008 Oregon state elections
 United States presidential election in Oregon, 2008
 United States House of Representatives elections in Oregon, 2008
 United States Senate election in Oregon, 2008

Pennsylvania
 2008 Pennsylvania Attorney General election
 2008 Pennsylvania Auditor General election
 Pennsylvania Democratic primary, 2008
 2008 Pennsylvania House of Representatives elections
 Pennsylvania Republican presidential primary, 2008
 2008 Pennsylvania Senate elections
 2008 Pennsylvania State Treasurer election
 2008 Pennsylvania elections
 United States House of Representatives elections in Pennsylvania, 2008

Puerto Rican
 2008 Puerto Rican general election
 Puerto Rico Democratic primary, 2008
 2008 Puerto Rico gubernatorial election
 New Progressive Party (Puerto Rico) primaries, 2008
 Popular Democratic Party (Puerto Rico) primaries, 2008
 Puerto Rico Republican caucuses, 2008
 United States House of Representatives election in Puerto Rico, 2008

Rhode Island
 Rhode Island Democratic primary, 2008
 Rhode Island Republican primary, 2008
 United States Senate election in Rhode Island, 2008

South Carolina
 South Carolina Democratic primary, 2008
 South Carolina Republican primary, 2008
 2008 South Carolina Senate elections
 Stephen Colbert presidential campaign, 2008
 United States House of Representatives elections in South Carolina, 2008
 United States presidential election in South Carolina, 2008
 United States Senate election in South Carolina, 2008

South Dakota
 United States House of Representatives election in South Dakota, 2008
 United States presidential election in South Dakota, 2008
 South Dakota Democratic primary, 2008
 South Dakota Republican primary, 2008
 United States Senate election in South Dakota, 2008

Tennessee
 Tennessee Democratic primary, 2008
 Tennessee Republican primary, 2008
 United States House of Representatives elections in Tennessee, 2008
 United States presidential election in Tennessee, 2008
 United States Senate election in Tennessee, 2008

Texas
 Texas Democratic primary and caucuses, 2008
 2008 Texas Legislature elections
 Texas Republican primary, 2008
 United States House of Representatives elections in Texas, 2008
 United States presidential election in Texas, 2008
 United States Senate election in Texas, 2008

United States Virgin Islands
 2008 United States Virgin Islands general election
 United States Virgin Islands Democratic territorial convention, 2008
 United States Virgin Islands Republican caucuses, 2008
 United States House of Representatives election in the United States Virgin Islands, 2008

Utah
 United States House of Representatives elections in Utah, 2008
 United States presidential election in Utah, 2008
 Utah Democratic primary, 2008
 Utah Republican primary, 2008
 2008 Utah gubernatorial election

Vermont
 United States presidential election in Vermont, 2008
 2008 Vermont gubernatorial election
 Vermont Democratic primary, 2008
 Vermont Republican primary, 2008
 2008 Vermont elections

Virginia
 2008 Virginia elections
 United States House of Representatives elections in Virginia, 2008
 United States Senate election in Virginia, 2008
 United States presidential election in Virginia, 2008
 Virginia Democratic primary, 2008
 Virginia Republican primary, 2008
 2008 Virginia's 1st congressional district election
 2008 Virginia's 7th congressional district election

Washington (U.S. state)
 Charter Amendment One (Pierce County, 2008)
 2008 Washington State Executive elections
 United States House of Representatives elections in Washington, 2008
 United States presidential election in Washington, 2008
 2008 Washington attorney general election
 Washington Death with Dignity Act
 Washington Democratic caucuses, 2008
 Washington Republican caucuses, 2008
 Washington Republican primary, 2008
 2008 Washington secretary of state election
 2008 Washington State House elections
 2008 Washington State Judicial elections
 2008 Washington State Senate elections
 2008 Washington State Supreme Court elections
 2008 Washington State local elections
 2008 Washington gubernatorial election

Washington, D.C.
 United States House of Representatives election in the District of Columbia, 2008
 United States presidential election in the District of Columbia, 2008

West Virginia
 2008 West Virginia gubernatorial election
 United States House of Representatives elections in West Virginia, 2008
 United States Senate election in West Virginia, 2008
 United States presidential election in West Virginia, 2008
 West Virginia Democratic primary, 2008
 West Virginia Republican caucuses and primary, 2008

Wisconsin
 United States presidential election in Wisconsin, 2008
 United States House of Representatives elections in Wisconsin, 2008
 Wisconsin Democratic primary, 2008
 Wisconsin Republican primary, 2008
 2008 Wisconsin state elections

Wyoming
 United States presidential election in Wyoming, 2008
 United States House of Representatives election in Wyoming, 2008
 United States Senate election in Wyoming, 2008
 United States Senate special election in Wyoming, 2008
 Wyoming Democratic caucuses, 2008
 Wyoming Republican caucuses, 2008

United States Virgin Islands
 2008 United States Virgin Islands general election
 United States Virgin Islands Democratic territorial convention, 2008
 United States Virgin Islands Republican caucuses, 2008
 United States House of Representatives election in the United States Virgin Islands, 2008

Oceania
 2008 Bougainvillean presidential election
 2008 French Polynesian legislative election
 2008 French Polynesian presidential election
 2008 Marshall Islands presidential election
 2008 Nauruan parliamentary election
 2008 Niuean general election
 2008 Palauan general election
 2008 Palauan presidential election
 2008 Tokelauan general election
 2008 Tongan general election
 2008 Tuvaluan constitutional referendum
 2008 Vanuatuan general election

American Samoa
 2008 American Samoan general election
 American Samoa Democratic caucuses, 2008
 2008 American Samoa gubernatorial election
 American Samoa Republican caucuses, 2008
 United States House of Representatives election in American Samoa, 2008

Australia
 2008 Australian Capital Territory general election
 2008 Cabramatta state by-election
 2008 City of Melbourne election
 2008 Gippsland by-election
 2008 Kororoit state by-election
 2008 Lakemba state by-election
 2008 Liberal Party of Australia leadership election
 2008 Lyne by-election
 2008 Mayo by-election
 2008 Murdoch state by-election
 2008 Northern Territory general election
 2008 Port Macquarie state by-election
 2008 Ryde state by-election
 2008 Western Australian state election

Guam
 2008 Guamanian general election
 Guam Democratic territorial convention, 2008
 2008 Guamanian legislative election
 Guam Republican caucuses, 2008
 United States House of Representatives election in Guam, 2008

Hawaii
 Hawaii Democratic caucuses, 2008
 Hawaii Republican caucuses, 2008
 United States House of Representatives elections in Hawaii, 2008
 United States presidential election in Hawaii, 2008

New Zealand general
 2008 New Zealand general election
 49th New Zealand Parliament
 Opinion polling for the 2008 New Zealand general election
 Party lists in the 2008 New Zealand general election

Northern Mariana Islands
 Northern Mariana Islands Republican caucuses, 2008
 United States House of Representatives election in the Northern Mariana Islands, 2008

South America
 2008 Bolivian autonomy referendums
 2008 Bolivian vote of confidence referendum
 2008 Brazilian municipal elections
 2008 Chilean municipal election
 2008 Ecuadorian constitutional referendum
 2008 Paraguayan general election
 2008 Santa Cruz autonomy referendum
 2008 Tarija autonomy referendum
 2008 Venezuelan regional elections

See also

 
2008
Elections